"That's Just Jessie" is a debut song co-written and recorded by American country music artist Kevin Denney.  It was released in December 2001 as the first single from his debut album Kevin Denney.  The song was written by Denney, Kerry Kurt Phillips and Patrick Jason Matthews.

Composition
"That's Just Jessie" is written in the key of E major with a main chord pattern of A-A4-B-B on the verses.  Co-writer Kerry Kurt Phillips had the song's title and overall idea for many years, but was unable to complete it until meeting with Patrick Jason Matthews and Kevin Denney. It was Matthews' first cut as a songwriter to be released as a single.

Chart performance
"That's Just Jessie" debuted at number 55 on the U.S. Billboard Hot Country Songs chart for the week of December 8, 2001.

Year-end charts

References

2001 debut singles
2001 songs
Kevin Denney songs
Lyric Street Records singles
Music videos directed by Peter Zavadil
Songs written by Kevin Denney
Songs written by Patrick Jason Matthews
Songs written by Kerry Kurt Phillips